Griffiths Glacier is a prominent cirque-type glacier located northeast of Crisp Glacier in the Gonville and Caius Range, Victoria Land, Antarctica. The feature drains east-southeast to Debenham Glacier to the east of Second Facet. It was named after Harold Griffiths (died 1974) who was associated with Antarctic exploration for over 50 years. He was instrumental in the New Zealand Antarctic Society's campaign to get the New Zealand Government to establish a presence in Antarctica.

References

Glaciers of Victoria Land
Scott Coast